Goodland may refer to:

Places

United States 
 Goodland, Florida
 Goodland, Indiana
 Goodland, Kansas
 Goodland Township, Michigan
 Goodland, Minnesota
 Goodland Township, Itasca County, Minnesota
 Goodland, Iron County, Missouri
 Goodland, Knox County, Missouri
 Goodland, Oklahoma
 Goodland, Bailey County, Texas
 Goodland, Robertson County, Texas

Elsewhere
 Goodland, Barbados
 Goodlands, Canada, the Canadian side of the Carbury–Goodlands Border Crossing
 Goodland, County Antrim, a townland in County Antrim, Northern Ireland
 Goodlands, Mauritius

People 
 Goodland (surname)

Other uses
 Benton County Wind Farm, Indiana, U.S., also known as Goodland I
 Goodland Academy, Choctaw County, Oklahoma, U.S.
 Goodland Field, now Nienhaus Field, in Appleton, Wisconsin, U.S.
 Goodland Municipal Airport, Goodland, Kansas, U.S.

See also